Park Byung-chul (born November 25, 1954) is a former South Korean footballer and football manager.

He was a member of South Korean national football team for five years in the 1970s. 
He played for the Hong Kong side Sea Bee and was a founding member of Lucky-Goldstar Hwangso (Currently FC Seoul).

International tournaments 
 1978 VII Asian games

References

External links 
 

1951 births
Living people
Sportspeople from Ulsan
South Korean footballers
Association football midfielders
South Korean expatriate footballers
South Korea international footballers
South Korean football managers
FC Seoul players
K League 1 players
Hong Kong First Division League players
1972 AFC Asian Cup players
Expatriate footballers in Hong Kong
South Korean expatriate sportspeople in Hong Kong
Hanyang University alumni
Sea Bee players